Hein is a Dutch and Low German masculine given name, a short version of Hendrik/Heinrich, a derivative surname most common in Germany.

Given name
 Hein van Aken (c. 1250 – c. 1325), Flemish poet 
 Hein de Baar (born 1949), Dutch oceanographer
 Hein van Breenen (1929–1990), Dutch racing cyclist
 Hein Boele (born 1939), Dutch voice actor
 Hein Donner (1927–1988), Dutch chess grandmaster
 Hein du Toit (born 1926), South African Army officer
 Hein van Garderen (born 1969), South African fencer
 Hein van de Geyn (born 1956), Dutch jazz bassist, composer and band leader
 Hein Frode Hansen (born 1972), Norwegian heavy metal drummer
 Hein Heckroth (1901–1970), German art director of stage and film productions
 Hein van der Heijden (born 1958), Dutch actor
 Hein Heinsen (born 1935), Danish artist
 Hein ten Hoff (1919–2003), German boxer
 Hein Hoyer (c. 1380–1447), German statesman and mayor of Hamburg
 Hein Kever (1854–1922), Dutch genre and still-life painter
 Hein de Kort (born 1956), Dutch cartoonist
 Hein Kötz (born 1935), German jurist
 Hein-Arne Mathiesen (born 1971), Norwegian ski jumper
 Hein-Direck Neu (1944–2017), German discus thrower
 Hein van der Niet (1901–1975), Dutch actor known in Hollywood as "Philip Dorn"
 Hein Odendaal (born 1942), South African medical doctor
 Hein Otterspeer (born 1988), Dutch speed skater
 Hein Potgieter (born 1982), South African rugby  player
 Hein ter Poorten (1887–1968), Dutch military officer in the Dutch Indies
 Hein Riess (1913–1993), German actor and folk singer
 Hein Roethof (1921–1996), Dutch journalist and politician
 Hein Schreuder (born 1951), Dutch economist and business executive
 Hein Seyerling, South African paralympic high jumper
 Hein Simons (born 1955), Dutch singer and actor
 Hein van Suylekom (1904–1982), Dutch rower
 Hein Vanhaezebrouck (born 1964), Belgian football coach
 Hein Verbruggen (born 1941), Dutch sports executive
 Hein Vergeer (born 1961), Dutch speed skater
 Hein Vos (1903–1972), Dutch politician
 Hein Wellens (born 1935), Dutch cardiologist
 Hein-Peter Weyher (born 1935), German Navy officer
 Hein Willemse (born 1957), South African academic, literary critic, activist and author
 Hein van der Zee (1929–1991), Dutch boxer

Burmese name
 Ba Hein (1917–1946), Burmese politician
 Hein Thiha Zaw (born 1995), Burmese footballer
 Hein Zar Aung (born 1990), Burmese footballer
 Ko Ko Hein (born 1994), Burmese footballer
 Kyaw Hein (born 1947), Burmese film actor, film director, and singer
 Moe Hein (1942–2010), Burmese poet and philanthropist
 Myat Hein (born 1955), Burmese general

Surname
 Birgit Hein (born 1942), German film director, producer and screenwriter
 Brandon Hein (born 1977), American convicted murderer
 Carl Christian Hein (1868–1937), American Lutheran clergyman
 Christian Hein (born 1982), German swimmer
 Christoph Hein (born 1944), German author and translator
 David W. Hein, American chemist
 Einar Hein (1875–1931), Danish painter
 Franz Hein (1892–1976), German scientist and artist
 Gauthier Hein (born 1996), French footballer
 Gustavo Hein (born 1972), Argentine politician
 Harald Hein (1950–2008), German fencer
 Harry Hein (born 1945), Estonian military Major General
 Herbert Hein (born 1954), German footballer
 Hillar Hein (born 1954), Estonian ski jumper, Nordic combined skier and coach
 Holly Hein (born 1991), American soccer player
 Jay Hein (born c. 1966), American lobbyist and cabinet member
Hein v. Freedom From Religion Foundation the Supreme Court case bearing his name
 Jeppe Hein (born 1974), Danish sculptor and installation artist
 John Hein (1886–1963), American wrestler
 Jon Hein (born 1967), American radio personality
 Jotun Hein (born 1956), Danish bioinformatician, son of Piet Hein
 Karen Hein (born 1944), American pediatrician
 Karl Hein (athlete) (1908–1982), German track and field athlete
 Leonard W. Hein (1916–2000), American economist and accountant
 Lucie Hein (1910–1965), East German politician
 Marjorie Hein (born 1946), American lawyer, writer and activist
 Mel Hein (1909–1992), American football player
 Michael P. Hein (born 1965), Northern Irish politician
 Michal Hein (born 1968), Israeli windsurfer
 Neil Hein (born 1963), Australian rules footballer
 Nick Hein (born 1984), German mixed martial artist
 Oliver Hein (born 1990), German footballer
 Peter Hein, Indian action choreographer and stunt coordinator
 Piet Hein (1577–1629), Dutch naval commander and folk hero
 Piet Hein (1905–1996), Danish poet and scientist, descendant of the above
 Riina Hein (born 1955), Estonian actress, director, producer and screenwriter
 Rolland Hein (born 1932), American literature academic and writer
 Ron Hein (1949-2022), American lobbyist and politician
 Rosemarie Hein (born 1953), German politician

Dutch masculine given names
German masculine given names
Danish-language surnames
Estonian-language surnames
German-language surnames
Burmese names
Surnames from given names